Shantinath Desai (ಶಾಂತಿನಾಥ ದೇಸಾಯಿ, 1929–1998) was one of the leading modern authors of the Navya (modernist) movement in Kannada Literature.

In most of his novels, short stories, and essays, Desai explores the challenges of a changing society and its drift from traditional values.
His first novel, Mukti (1961), narrates the protagonist's quest for an independent identity, liberation from the influence of a friend and his infatuation with the friend's sister. The second novel, Vikshepa (1971), tells the story of a village youth from northern Karnataka, who attempts to flee from his traditional environment by studying English in Bombay and later relocating to England. He was one of the best known writers in the genre of short stories in Kannada literature, which includes other prominent writers like U. R. Anantha Murthy, Yashwant Chittal, P. Lankesh, Ramachandra Sharma, Rajalakshmi Rao, and K. Sadashiva.

His novel Om Namo (Obeisance) won the Sahitya Akademi Award. 
Desai's important works include Mukti  (Liberation) and Beeja (The Seed).

Shantinath Desai was also a professor of English at Shivaji University in Kolhapur, and later became the first vice chancellor of the then newly founded Kuvempu University in Shimoga. He has written seven novels and eight short story collections of which Rakshasa (1977) received the Karnataka Sahitya Academy Award. His novels and stories have been frequently translated into various regional languages. He also published a book of critical works in English.

Shantinath Desai is remembered for his works such as Mukti, Om  Namo, Srishti and Beeja (Novels) and short stories like Kshitija, Naanan Tirthayatre, Ganda Satta Mele, Manjugadde, Dande, Parivartane, Kurmavatara, Rakshasa, Nadiya Neeru, Hero, Bharamya Hogi Nikhilanagiddu, Digbhrame and other works. His readers and admirers feel that he deserved more honours and recognition than he actually received. He got Sahitya Akademi Award posthumously for his novel Om Namo in 2000. He is considered as one of the important writers in modern Kannada literature.

Collection of Stories

 Manjugadde/ಮಂಜುಗಡ್ಡೆ - 1959

 Kshithija/ಕ್ಷಿತಿಜ - 1966

 Dande/ದಂಡೆ - 1971

 Rakshasa/ರಾಕ್ಷಸ - 1977

 Parivarthane/ಪರಿವರ್ತನೆ - 1982

 Aayda Kathegalu/ಆಯ್ದ ಕಥೆಗಳು - 1987 (Text Edition)

 Koormavathara/ಕೂರ್ಮಾವತಾರ - 1988

 Aayda Kathegalu/ಆಯ್ದ ಕಥೆಗಳು - 2007

 Samagra Kathegalu/ಸಮಗ್ರ ಕಥೆಗಳು - 2001 (An Anthology of Complete Short Stories)

Novels

 Mukti/ಮುಕ್ತಿ - 1961 (Translated in all the 14 Indian Languages by National Book Trust)

 Vikshepa/ವಿಕ್ಷೇಪ - 1973

 Srushti/ಸೃಷ್ಟಿ - 1979

 Sambandha/ಸಂಬಂಧ - 1982

 Beeja/ಬೀಜ - 1983

 Antarala/ಅಂತರಾಳ - 1993

 Om Namo/ಓಂ ನಮೋ - 1999 (Translated in all the 14 Indian Languages by Sahitya Akademi)

Poetry

 Shantinath Desai Avara Kavithegalu/ಶಾಂತಿನಾಥ ದೇಸಾಯಿ ಅವರ ಕವಿತೆಗಳು - 2016

Criticism

 Sahitya Mattu Bhaashe/ಸಾಹಿತ್ಯ ಮತ್ತು ಭಾಷೆ - 1980

 Kannada Kadambari Nadedu Banda Reethi/ಕನ್ನಡ ಕಾದಂಬರಿ ನಡೆದು ಬಂದ ರೀತಿ - 1989

 Navya Sahitya Darshana/ನವ್ಯ ಸಾಹಿತ್ಯ ದರ್ಶನ - 1989

 M. N. Roy/ಎಂ. ಎನ್. ರಾಯ್ - 1994

Translation

 Mee/ಮೀ

 Rathachakra/ರಥಚಕ್ರ

 Premchand/ಪ್ರೇಮಚಂದ

English Works

 Experimentation with Language in Indian Writing in English (Fiction)

 Babhani Bhattacharya

 Santha Ramrao

 Indian Poetry Today (Kannada)

 Contemporary Indian Short Stories (Editor)

 Avasthe (U. R. Ananthamurthy) 

 Here Revolution Comes (P. Lankesh)

About Him and His Literature

 Shantinath Desai (Biography)/ಶಾಂತಿನಾಥ ದೇಸಾಯಿ - G. S. Amur/ಜಿ. ಎಸ್. ಆಮೂರ

 Shantinath Desai (Biography)/ಶಾಂತಿನಾಥ ದೇಸಾಯಿ - Preeti Shubhachandra/ಪ್ರೀತಿ ಶುಭಚಂದ್ರ

 Shantinath Desai Avara Sahitya/ಶಾಂತಿನಾಥ ದೇಸಾಯಿ ಅವರ ಸಾಹಿತ್ಯ - Giraddi Govindraj (Ed.)/ಗಿರಡ್ಡಿ ಗೋವಿಂದರಾಜ 

 Shantinath Desai Sahitya Vaachike/ಶಾಂತಿನಾಥ ದೇಸಾಯಿ ಸಾಹಿತ್ಯ ವಾಚಿಕೆ - Ramachandra Deva (Ed.)/ರಾಮಚಂದ್ರ ದೇವ (ಸಂ.)

Awards 

 Karnataka Sahitya Akademi Award for his short story collection Rakshasa/ರಾಕ್ಷಸ (1978) 

 Sahitya Akademi Award for Om Namo/ಓಂ ಣಮೋ (2000)
  
 The Ideal Teacher Award by the Government of Maharashtra

 Rajyotsava Award by Government of Karnataka
 
 Karnataka Sahitya Akademi Honorary Award for Lifetime Achievement (1984)

 Sudha Magazine Award for his novel Sambandha/ಸಂಬಂಧ (1982)

Teleserial
 Om Namo/ಓಂ ಣಮೋ (DD Chandana) Directed by Girish Karnad and K. M. Chaitanya

 Digbhrame/ದಿಗ್ಭ್ರಮೆ (DD Chandana)

References

Kannada-language writers
Recipients of the Sahitya Akademi Award in Kannada
1929 births
1998 deaths
Writers from Karnataka
Shivaji University
People from Uttara Kannada
20th-century Indian short story writers
20th-century Indian novelists